Walnut Grove is a town in Walton County, Georgia, United States. The population was 1,330 according to the 2010 census.

History
The Georgia General Assembly incorporated Walnut Grove as a town in 1905. The community was named for a grove of walnut trees near the original town site.

Geography

Walnut Grove is located at  (33.745470, -83.857319).

According to the United States Census Bureau, the town has a total area of 1.5 square miles (3.9 km), all land.

Demographics

2020 census

As of the 2020 United States census, there were 1,322 people, 515 households, and 371 families residing in the city.

2010 census
According to the 2010 US census, there were 1,330 people, 466 households, and 364 families residing in Walnut Grove. The racial makeup of the town was 92.2% White, 6.7% African American, 1.2% Asian, and 2.9% from other races. Hispanic or Latino people of any race were 3.5% of the population.

Out of the 466 households, 48.9% had children under the age of 18 living with them, 58.4% were married couples living together, 13.7% had a female householder with no husband present, and 21.9% were non-families. 17.0% of all households were made up of individuals, and 4.8% had someone living alone who was 65 years of age or older. The average household size was 2.85 and the average family size was 3.24.

Of the population of Walnut Grove, 31.1% were under the age of 18 and 8.6% were 65 years or older. The median age was 35.7 years.

According to the U.S. Census Bureau's 2013 American Community Survey, the estimated median income for a household in Walnut Grove was $50,769 with a margin of error of +/-$9,264. The estimated median home value was $129,800.

Education
Public education in Walnut Grove is administered by Walton County School District. The district operates Walnut Grove Elementary School and Walnut Grove High School within the city.

Notable people
 Barbecue Bob, blues musician
 Bazoline Estelle Usher, educator

References

Towns in Walton County, Georgia
Towns in Georgia (U.S. state)